Książ Landscape Park (Książański Park Krajobrazowy) is a protected area (Landscape Park) in south-western Poland, established in 1981, covering an area of . It takes its name from the historic castle of Książ, which overlooks the Pełcznica River.

The Park lies within Lower Silesian Voivodeship: in Świdnica County (Gmina Dobromierz, Świebodzice, Gmina Świdnica) and Wałbrzych County (Gmina Stare Bogaczowice).

Within the Landscape Park are two nature reserves.

References 

Landscape parks in Poland
Parks in Lower Silesian Voivodeship